Varese (or ;  ; ; archaic ) is a city and comune in north-western Lombardy, northern Italy,  north-west of Milan. The population of Varese in 2018 was 80,559.

It is the capital of the Province of Varese. The hinterland or exurban part of the city is called Varesotto.

Geography 

The city of Varese lies at the foot of Sacro Monte di Varese, part of the Campo dei Fiori mountain range, that hosts an astronomical observatory, as well as the Prealpino Geophysical Centre. The village which is in the middle of the mountain is called Santa Maria del Monte because of the medieval sanctuary, which is reached through the avenue of the chapels of the Sacred Mountain. Varese is situated on seven hills: the San Pedrino Hill, the Giubiano Hill, the Campigli Hill, the Sant'Albino Hill, the Biumo Superiore Hill, Colle di Montalbano (Villa Mirabello) and the Hill of Miogni. The city also looks over Lake Varese.

Climate 
Varese's winters are not significantly affected by the proximity of Lago Maggiore and the minor lakes surrounding it. In late autumn and winter, temperatures frequently fall below zero Celsius, even if just by a few degrees. This differentiates it from areas south of the city. As in other cities in the foothills of Lombardy, fog is an infrequent phenomenon. Varese is on average cooler than other cities of the Lombard Prealps, especially in winter. Since the 1980s, snow has fallen less frequently, with the annual average going from 69 cm in 1967–1987 to 33 cm in 1988–2017.

Demographics 
Varese city, like the province, has a very high immigrant population owing to both its economy (many multinational companies and the EU's Joint Research Centre in nearby Ispra) and its location (proximity to Milan makes it an ideal place for the latter city's workers).

Government

History 

This town has been known since the Early Middle Ages when it became officially a municipality. The population by 1848 was about 4000.

In 1859, Giuseppe Garibaldi confronted Austrian forces led by Field Marshal-Lieutenant Carl Baron Urban near Varese. Also, it was here where Alessandro Marchetti's Savoia-Marchetti SM.93 made his first test flights.

In the 20th century, thanks to the increase in population and to the improvement of its economy, the dimensions of this urban centre rose. During the 20th century, its economy flourished quickly, mainly in manufacturing, in the mechanical and electromechanical industry and textile industry. Varese was well known for the footwear industry.

Symbols

The coat of arms of the City of Varese dates back to around 1347. On the wooden cover of the double copy of the Burgi et Castellatiae de Varisio Statutes, preserved in the municipal archive, the oldest example of a civic coat of arms is depicted: "silver Samnite shield. with two corners of red, right and left on the head; all around closed by a black band". The effigy of San Vittore has no crown. It is probably in the sixteenth century - as the Varese historian Luigi Borri believes in his work Documenti Varesini of 1891 - that the shield was surmounted by the marquis crown and the effigy of St. Victor, patron saint of the city.

The coat of arms was recognized by decree of the head of the government of 17 June 1941 and the banner was granted with the royal decree of 28 April 1941.

Transport 
The road and rail infrastructure network that makes up the connection system of the city of Varese is powered by a lot of little streets and a double rail network and by 74,000 of high mobility. In particular, the major movements are incoming into Varese. In the average weekday over 113,000 vehicles enter Varese.

The most used form of transportation in Varese is the private vehicle, followed by the local public transport. The A8 motorway connects Varese with Milan. The city has also a Ring Road System: Varese's Ring Road consists of three roads currently in operation and one more under construction (North Ring Road). The currently operating roads of Varese's Ring Road System are the East Ring Road, a double lane road managed by ANAS; South Ring Road, a double lane highway managed by Autostrada Pedemontana Lombarda; North East Ring Road, a single lane road managed by ANAS.

Many important national and provincial roads pass through Varese.

The entire rail network serving the capital is electrified. The city is served by three railway stations:

- Varese FS, managed by Centostazioni and RFI SpA, Ferrovie Dello Stato Group: it is the first/last station of Suburban Line S5 of Milan Varese-Treviglio via Milan (operated by ATM-Trenord) and runs a high-frequency train to Milan and Porto Ceresio, toward Switzerland (operated by Trenord). In addition, Varese FS provides direct trains to Malpensa Airport, Como, Mendrisio and Lugano (Switzerland).
- Varese Nord (in the city centre) and Varese Casbeno (in the neighbourhood of Casbeno), managed by FerrovieNord on Milan Cadorna-Saronno-Varese-Laveno line: train service is operated by Trenord.

The city has both an extensive city bus network (12 lines + 3 lines in the urban area) operated by Autolinee Varesine, and suburban bus services. International bus services are operated by Swiss Post Bus of line 523 that link Varese to Lugano and Mendrisio.

In Varese there is also a funicular service on the Vellone-Sacro Monte funicular.

Main sights 
The city is home to the Sacro Monte di Varese ('the Sacred Mount of Varese'), a place of pilgrimage and worship. It is one of the Sacri Monti of Piedmont and Lombardy, included on the UNESCO World Heritage list.

Civic buildings 

Varese is rich in castles, many once pertaining to the Borromeo family. The historic centre of the city includes the Praetorian Palace and Villa Cagna, a residential complex that also hosts the Civic Music School of Varese.

After the 19th century, it was enriched by villas and their surrounding gardens, many now open to visitors, including:
 Villa Recalcati in Casbeno was built in the early 18th century, enlarged during 1756–77, and was once a luxury hotel. It now houses the offices of the Province of Varese and the Prefecture. 
 Villa Mylius, near the town centre, was once owned by the Jesuit order, and in 1773 the house and park were sold to the notable Francesco Torelli, who transformed a modest building into a large villa, then sold in 1902 to the industrialist George Mylius. After his death, the property was divided among several heirs, who in 1946 jointly sold it to the Varesino Achille Cattaneo, and he donated to the town of Varese in 2007. 
 Villa Toeplitz, in the Sant'Ambrogio district stands, with a large public park. The complex is named after Giuseppe Toeplitz (1866–1938), a Polish-born banker who bought it in 1914. Already modest country residence of the German family Hannesen, was enlarged by Toeplitz after World War II when his wife Hedwig Mrozowska and his son Louis sold it to brothers Mocchetti of Legnano. The complex with the elegant Italian park passed to the Municipality of Varese in 1972.
Ville Ponti was built between 1850 and 1870 by Milanese architect Giuseppe Balzaretto (1801–1874) for Andrea Ponti. In 1976, it was converted into a convention centre. The main building, surrounded by a public park, is decorated internally by Giuseppe Bertini (1825–1898). Part of the complex, Villa Fabio Ponti is a neoclassical-style villa housed in 1959 headquarters for Garibaldi.
 Villa Menafoglio Litta Panza in locations Biumo Superiore, opposite the entrance of Ville Ponti, was commissioned in the mid-18th century by the Marquis Paolo Antonio Menafoglio, and is an example of a vacation home in Varese. The villa with the garden was partly transformed during the Napoleonic period (neoclassical hall) when the garden was converted into an English-style garden. Recognized since 1996 as well protected by the FAI, the building currently hosts the contemporary art collection of the family Panza.
 Villa Augusta, in the Giubiano neighbourhood, was built in the second half of the 19th century. Already owned by Testoni, passed to the Hospital of Circolo di Varese and then, 30 September 1952, was ceded to the Roman Catholic order of the Sisters of Helpers of Holy Souls who pray for souls in Purgatory. Since 1968, the villa was purchased by the city and houses municipal offices. The park is open to the public from 5 April 1970.
 Villa Baragiola, in Masnago, has a well-visited park. On the north side, in the shadow of Mount Campo dei Fiori, in 1895 the lawyer Andrea Baragiola opened one of the first Italian racecourses, which extended to the area now occupied by the stadium "Franco Ossola" and its ample parking. The villa was renovated in the early thirties, and in the next decade refurbished as a religious seminary. Passed to the Municipality of Varese in 2001, today is a part of its offices, while the park is open to the public.
 Masnago Castle.

In the city centre, there is the Palazzo Estense with its gardens (built in the 17th century) and Villa Mirabello. Villa Mirabello, the seat of Museo Civico Archeologico (Civic Archaeological Museum), was built in the late 600s on the top of the hill which carries its name. This site is surrounded by a park which is set close to the park of Palazzo Estense.

Natural areas 
In addition to numerous public parks of the city, often appurtenances of historic villas, there is the Park Luigi Zanzi in Schiranna, established in the sixties through a partial filling of the coast of Lake Varese. It is a large botanical garden located on the banks of Lake Varese, rich in numerous species of trees and birdlife that is partially sheltered in the reeds along the banks. Bathing beach in the summer, the park also offers the possibility of peaceful walks and cycling on the bike path.

Close to the city of Varese is the Regional Park Campo dei Fiori, a natural reserve of over five thousand acres consisting of the massive mountain Campo dei Fiori and Mount Martica, separate from that valley Rasa which is the junction of Valcuvia and Olona valley. Once the peak of the Campo dei Fiori was characterized by extensive grassland, it became the historical destination of tourism of Varese and of Milan. Today is the spectacular blooms - which gave the name to the area - to be one of its main attractions. It is a very diverse place showing aspects of extreme interest, related both to the natural environment, both in history and culture, referring to a past full of events and traditions. There are small farming villages, monuments of rare beauty, cave systems and articulated a well-maintained network of trails: some passable, as well as on foot, on horseback and on bicycle. Inside the park are established six nature reserves enclosing environments most important and characteristic.

Economy 
The economy of Varese is mainly based on industry and, to a lesser extent, specialized agriculture; some famous Varese-based firms are:
 Aermacchi (military trainer aircraft)
 AgustaWestland (helicopters)
 Bticino (electrics)
 Cagiva, MV Agusta (motorbikes)
 Cobra Automotive Technologies (automotive)
 Ficep (Machine Tools for steel construction)
 Ignis (now part of Whirlpool) (electronics)
 Vibram
 Prealpi (cheese)
 Mazzuchelli (plastics)
 Missoni (fashion)
 Di Varese (shoes)
and many more as it is one of the most industrialised areas in Northern Italy.

Varese is close to Malpensa International Airport, which serves the international traffic of Milan, Italy.

Education 
Varese is home to a European School, the European School, Varese, which was established in 1960 for the children of European Union staff, who work mainly at one of the three institutes of the Joint Research Centre in nearby Ispra.

It is one of the two sites of the University of Insubria, located in the heart of the Garden City is hosting in the newly built Campus Bizzozero faculties of Medicine, Economics, Natural Sciences etc.

People 
 Ferruccio Azzarini (1924–2005), footballer
 Flaminio Bertoni (1903–1964), a sculptor and industrial designer known especially for his work at Citroën where he designed the 2CV, the H van, the DS and the Ami 6
 Giulio Bizzozero (1846–1901), one of the pioneers of histography, and, more generally, the use of the microscope in medical research

 Luigi Boffi (1846-1904), architect
 Laura Bono (born 1979), singer and songwriter
 Umberto Bossi (born 1941), politician; leader of the Lega Lombarda, and of the Lega Nord; Minister for Institutional Reforms and Devolution and Minister of Federal Reforms
 Lilli Carati (1956–2014), model and pornographic actress
 Emilio Dandolo (1830–1859), brother of Enrico, who also participated in several of the most important battles of the Risorgimento, including the Five Days of Milan uprising
 Enrico Dandolo (1827–1849), a figure of the Italian Risorgimento who participated in several of its most important battles and participated in the formation of the Roman Republic
 Attilio Fontana (born 1952), politician, president of Lombardy since 2018
 Angelo Frattini (1910–75), sculptor
 Gennaro Gattuso (born 1978), professional football player
 Roberto Gervasini (born 1947), athletic champion runner
 Laura Macchi (born 1979), basketball player whose career began at Pallacanestro Varese
 Pietro Antonio Magatti (1691–1767), a painter active in Lombardy in a late-Baroque (barocchetto) style
 Roberto Maroni (born 1955), Italian politician of Lega Nord
 Calogero Marrone (1889–1945), Righteous Among the Nations
 Stefano Marzano (born 1950), industrial designer, Chief Design Officer of Electrolux
 Andrea Meneghin (born 1974), basketball player and coach with Pallacanestro Varese
 Dino Meneghin (born 1950), professional basketball player for Ignis Varese
 Ottavio Missoni, designer and founder of the Italian fashion house Missoni which is also based in Varese
 Mario Monti (born 1943), economist and politician
 Emilio Morosini (1830–1849), participant in the Risorgimento
 Bob Morse, in 2009, in recognition of his contributions on and off the basketball court, the City Council of Varese, Italy, made Robert Duncan "Bob" Morse an honorary citizen of the city
 Attilio Nicora (born 1937), cardinal of the Roman Catholic Church and Emeritus Bishop of Verona
 Aldo Ossola (born 1945), a basketball player
 Franco Ossola (1921–1949), a member of the Torino F.C. squad who died in the Superga air disaster; Stadio Franco Ossola, the stadium of A.S. Varese 1910, is named in his honour
 Roberto Plano (born 1978), pianist
 Renato Pozzetto (born 1940), actor, director and cabaret artist and one of the best-loved figures of Italian comedy in recent years
 Flavio Premoli (born 1949), musician and composer 
 Lia Quartapelle (born 1982), politician
 Alessio Rovera (born 1995), racing driver
 Corsi Sandro, 2013 Fellow of the Institute of Electrical and Electronics Engineers
 Francesco Tamagno (1850–1905), an operatic tenor and the creator of the role of Verdi's Otello, who lived at Varese and died at his villa there, aged 54
 Carlo Maria Viganò (born 1941), Archbishop and Apostolic Nuncio to the United States, 2011 to 2016
 Giuseppe Zamberletti (born 1933), Italian politician recognised as the founding father of the modern Italian Department of Civil Protection

Cycling
Varese has had a long and strong tradition of competitive cycling. It hosted the 1951 and 2008 World Road Cycling Championships.

One of the biggest events is the yearly Tre Valli Varesine, which usually takes place at the end of September beginning of October.

Varese has been home to numerous cyclists, including:

 Ivan Basso (born 1977), professional cyclist and winner of the 2006 and 2010 Giro d'Italia
 Alfredo Binda (1902–1986), a cyclist of the 1920s and 1930s, later trainer of Fausto Coppi and Gino Bartali
 Gianni Bugno (born 1964), cyclist
 Noemi Cantele (born 1981), cyclist
 Valentina Carretta (born 1989), cyclist
 Claudio Chiappucci (born 1963), cyclist
 Gabriele Colombo (born 1972), cyclist
 Davide Frattini (born 1978), cyclist
 Francesco Frattini (born 1967), cyclist
 Óscar Freire (born 1976), Spanish cyclist
 Stefano Garzelli (born 1973), cyclist; overall winner of the 2000 Giro d'Italia
 Paride Grillo (born 1982), cyclist with CSF Group–Navigare
 Daniele Nardello (born 1972), a professional road racing cyclist who rides for Serramenti PVC Diquigiovanni–Androni Giocattoli
 Andrea Peron (born 1971), cyclist
 Michael Rogers (born 1979), Australian cyclist
 Charly Wegelius (born 1978), British cyclist
 Cameron Wurf (born 1983), ex Australian Olympic rower and now professional cyclist for Cannondale Liquigas
 Stefano Zanini (born 1969), cyclist

Music festivals 

 Open Jazz Varese 
 Ghost Day Festival

Sport 
Varese is known for the Pallacanestro Varese which played, in the 1970s, 10 European Champions Cup finals in a row and won 5 of them.

 A.S. Varese 1910 (football)
 A.S. Mastini Varese Hockey
 Pro Tennis Team Varese
 2008 UCI Road World Championships
 1951 UCI Road World Championships

International relations

Varese is twinned with:
 Alba Iulia, Romania
 Romans-sur-Isère, France

References

External links 

 
 Tourist information, Agenzia del Turismo Varese
 arci Varese, association for the promotion of social, Territorial Delegation

 
Cities and towns in Lombardy